Chikola (Tsykola) is a rural locality (a selo) and the administrative center of Irafsky District of the Republic of North Ossetia–Alania, Russia. Population:

References

Notes

Sources

Rural localities in North Ossetia–Alania